The Lava Bed Mountains are located in the Mojave Desert in southeastern California, United States. The mountains lie in a northwest-southeasterly direction, and are located almost entirely within the Marine Corps Air Ground Combat Center Twentynine Palms, which is a restricted area. Gays Pass is located at the southern end of the chain, with the Rodman Mountains to the northwest.

References

Mountain ranges of Southern California
Mountain ranges of San Bernardino County, California